The Constitution of California is the primary organizing law for the U.S. state of California, describing the duties, powers, structures and functions of the government of California. California's constitution was drafted in both English and Spanish by American pioneers, European settlers, and Californios (Hispanics of California) and adopted at the 1849 Constitutional Convention of Monterey, following the American Conquest of California and the Mexican–American War and in advance of California's Admission to the Union in 1850. The constitution was amended and ratified on 7 May 1879, following the Sacramento Convention of 1878–79.

The Constitution of California is one of the longest collections of laws in the world, partially due to provisions enacted during the Progressive Era limiting powers of elected officials, but largely due to additions by California ballot proposition and voter initiatives, which take form as constitutional amendments. Constitutional amendments may be proposed by the California Legislature or by popular petition through the exercise of the initiative power by the voters, giving California one of the most flexible legal systems in the world. It is currently the eighth longest constitution in the world.

Many of the individual rights clauses in the state constitution have been construed as protecting rights even broader than the United States Bill of Rights in the Federal Constitution. An example is the case of Pruneyard Shopping Center v. Robins, in which "free speech" rights beyond those addressed by the First Amendment to the United States Constitution were found in the California Constitution by the California courts. One of California's most significant prohibitions is against "cruel or unusual punishment," a stronger prohibition than the U.S. Constitution's Eighth Amendment prohibition against "cruel and unusual punishment."

History

The constitution has undergone numerous changes since its original drafting. It was rewritten from scratch several times before the drafting of the current 1879 constitution, which has itself been amended or revised (see below).

In response to widespread public disgust with the powerful railroads that controlled California's politics and economy at the start of the 20th century, Progressive Era politicians pioneered the concept of aggressively amending the state constitution by initiative in order to remedy perceived evils. From 1911, the height of the U.S. Progressive Era, to 1986, the California Constitution was amended or revised over 500 times.

The constitution gradually became increasingly bloated, leading to abortive efforts towards a third constitutional convention in 1897, 1914, 1919, 1930, 1934 and 1947. By 1962, the constitution had grown to 75,000 words, which at that time was longer than any other state constitution but Louisiana's.

That year, the electorate approved the creation of a California Constitution Revision Commission, which worked on a comprehensive revision of the constitution from 1964 to 1976. The electorate ratified the commission's revisions in 1966, 1970, 1972, and 1974, but rejected the 1968 revision, whose primary substantive effect would have been to make the state's superintendent of schools into an appointed rather than an elected official. The Commission ultimately removed about 40,000 words from the constitution.

Provisions
The California Constitution is one of the longest in the world. The length has been attributed to a variety of factors, such as influence of previous Mexican civil law, lack of faith in elected officials and the fact that many initiatives take the form of a constitutional amendment. Several amendments involved the authorization of the creation of state government agencies, including the State Compensation Insurance Fund and the State Bar of California; the purpose of such amendments was to insulate the agencies from being attacked as an unconstitutionally broad exercise of police power or inherent judicial power.

Unlike other state constitutions, the California Constitution strongly protects the corporate existence of cities and counties and grants them broad plenary home rule powers. The constitution gives charter cities, in particular, supreme authority over municipal affairs, even allowing such cities' local laws to trump state law. By specifically enabling cities to pay counties to perform governmental functions for them, Section 8 of Article XI resulted in the rise of the contract city.

Article 4, section 8(d) defines an "urgency statute" as one "necessary for immediate preservation of the public peace, health, or safety"; any proposed bill including such a provision includes a "statement of facts constituting the necessity" and a two-thirds majority of each house is required to also separately pass the bill's urgency section.

Many of the individual rights clauses in the state constitution have been construed as protecting rights broader than the Bill of Rights in the federal constitution. Two examples include (1) the Pruneyard Shopping Center v. Robins case involving an implied right to free speech in private shopping centers, and (2) the first decision in America in 1972 which found the death penalty unconstitutional, California v. Anderson, 6 Cal. 3d 628. This noted that under California's state constitution a stronger protection applies than under the U.S. Constitution's Eighth Amendment; the former prohibits punishments that are "cruel or unusual", while the latter only prohibits punishments that are "cruel and unusual".  The constitution also confers upon women equality of rights in "entering or pursuing a business, profession, vocation, or employment."  This is the earliest state constitutional equal rights provision on record.

Two universities are expressly mentioned in the constitution: the public state-run University of California and the private Stanford University.  UC is one of only nine state-run public universities in the United States whose independence from political interference is expressly guaranteed by the state constitution. Since 1900, Stanford has enjoyed the benefit of a constitutional clause shielding Stanford-owned property from taxes as long as it is used for educational purposes.

Amendments and revisions

The California Constitution distinguishes between constitutional amendments and constitutional revisions, the latter of which is considered to be a "substantial change to the entire constitution, rather than ... a less extensive change in one or more of its provisions". Both require passage of a California ballot proposition by the voters, but they differ in how they may be proposed. A constitutional amendment may be placed on the ballot by either a two-thirds vote in the California State Legislature or by signatures equal to 8% of the votes cast in the last gubernatorial election through the exercise of the initiative power by the voters. The signature requirement for constitutional amendments is among the lowest thresholds for similar measures of any U.S. state.

, this was 997,139 signatures compared to an estimated 2018 population of 39,557,045. A constitutional revision originally required a constitutional convention but today may be passed with the approval of both two-thirds of the Legislature and approval by a majority of voters; while simplified since its beginnings, the revision process is considered more politically charged and difficult to successfully pass than an amendment. Voters exercising the initiative power are not permitted to propose a constitutional revision.

Signatories of the 1849 Constitution

Many of the signatories to the state's original 1849 constitution were themselves prominent in their own right, and are listed below. The list notably includes several Californios (California-born, Spanish-speaking residents).

Representing the District of Los Angeles
 José Antonio Carrillo
 Manuel Domínguez
 Stephen Clark Foster
 Hugo Reid
 Abel Stearns
Representing the District of Monterey
 Charles T. Botts
 Lewis Dent
 Thomas O. Larkin
 Pacificus Ord
 Henry Wager Halleck
Representing the District of Sacramento
 Elisha Oscar Crosby
 Lansford Hastings
 Morton Matthew McCarver
 John McDougall
 William E. Shannon
 Winfield S. Sherwood
 Jacob R. Snyder
 John Sutter
Representing the District of San Diego
 Miguel de Pedrorena
 Henry Hill
Representing the District of San Francisco
 Alfred James Ellis
 Edward Gilbert
 William M. Gwin
 Josephn Hobson
 Francis J. Lippitt
 Myron Norton
 William Morris Stewart
 Rodman M. Price

Representing the District of San Joaquin
 John McHenry Hollingsworth
 James McHall Jones
 Benjamin S. Lippincott
 Benjamin F. Moore
 Thomas L. Vermeule
 Oliver Wozencraft
Representing the District of San Luis Obispo
 José María Covarrubias
 Henry A. Tefft
Representing the District of Santa Barbara
 Pablo de la Guerra
 Jacinto Rodríguez
Representing the District of San José
 Joseph Aram
 Elam Brown
 Kimball Hale Dimmick
 Julian Hanks
 Jacob David Hoppe
 Antonio María Pico
 Pedro Sainsevain
Representing the District of Sonoma
 Mariano Guadalupe Vallejo
 Robert B. Semple
 Joel P. Walker

See also

 Government of California
 Politics of California
 Law of California

Notes

References

External links

 Official current text of the California Constitution
  Records of the Constitutional Convention of 1849, California State Archives
 1849 California Constitution, full original English text, California State Archives
 1849 California Constitution (Spanish:Constitución del Estado de California), full original Spanish text, California State Archives
 1879 California Constitution, original unamended full text, California State Archives
 1878–1879 Constitutional Convention Working Papers, California State Archives

Constitution
Amendments to the Constitution of California
California ballot propositions
1849 in California
1879 in California
1849 in American law
1879 in American law
1849 establishments in California
1879 establishments in California
Pre-statehood history of California
History of California
California